Euxesta basalis is a species of ulidiid or picture-winged fly in the genus Euxesta of the family Ulidiidae. It was described by Francis Walker in 1853.

References

basalis
Insects described in 1853
Taxa named by Francis Walker (entomologist)